Thomas Browne Wallace (1865 – 28 April 1951)  was the Member of Parliament for West Down, 1921–1922.

Life
He was son of Robert Smyths Wallace, of Dromore, and was admitted a solicitor in 1887. A Unionist, he was elected for
West Down on 14 July 1921.  He was appointed Chief Clerk of the High Court of Justice of Northern Ireland in 1922.

References

External links 
 

1865 births
1951 deaths
Members of the Parliament of the United Kingdom for County Down constituencies (1801–1922)
UK MPs 1918–1922
Ulster Unionist Party members of the House of Commons of the United Kingdom